Kubau Local Government Area is one of the 23 Local Government Areas in Kaduna State, Nigeria. It has its headquarters in the town of Anchau. The Local Government Council is chaired by Bashir Zuntu. The present Chaiman Hon Sabo Aminu Anchau.

It was created during the military rule of General Sani Abacha, on November 2, 1995, from the present Ikara Local Government Area.

Subdivisions
It has eleven (11) political wards, which includes the local government headquarters, Anchau, Pampegua, Zuntu, Dutsen-wai, Damau, Kargi, Karreh, Mah, Kubau, Haskiya, and Zabi. It also has 10 District with Anchau and Kubau being the oldest as well as the influential among them. The postal code of the area is 811.

Kubau local government has an ancient villages such as Anchau, Gadas, Kuzuntu with a headquarter in Jenau 10 km from the main Anchau.

People
The major tribes are predominantly Hausa and Fulani. Although there are immigrant tribes like Sayawa, Kurama, etc. but they are very much few.

The people of Kubau LG are predominantly Muslim by religion, although there are some Christians in some parts of the local government.

Government
Hamisu Ibrahim Kubau is the current serving member representing Ikara/Kubau Federal Constituency, Kaduna State.

Economy 
Kubau local government have the famous Anchau weekly (Tuesday) Market for selling of cattle and many other agricultural produce such as maize, corn, soya beans among others. Another main market is located in Pambegua a junction town for selling of many agricultural commodities on Fridays. Other Markets are the Dutsenwai Tomatoes Market a seasonal market for selling of Irrigated agricultural commodities like Tomatoes, Kogi Tomatoes market is another seasonal market located on Anchau Dutsenwai road at the village of Kogi in Kuzuntu.

It has a lot of natural resources which including iron ore, tin. It is a major agricultural production area in Kaduna State, its major product is sugarcane.

Education 
Kubau local government has many primary and secondary schools in all the 11 wards. However, there are no higher institutions in the area.

Area and Population
It has an area of 2,505 km and a population of 282,045 at the 2006 census.

References

Local Government Areas in Kaduna State